Arrows of the Thunder Dragon is a 2013 Australian drama film directed by Greg Sneddon. The film was selected as the Australian entry for the Best Foreign Language Film at the 88th Academy Awards but it was not nominated. The film was shot in Bhutan.

Cast
 Kandu as Sangay
 Tshering Zam as Jamyang

See also
 List of submissions to the 88th Academy Awards for Best Foreign Language Film
 List of Australian submissions for the Academy Award for Best Foreign Language Film

References

External links
 

2013 films
2013 drama films
Australian drama films
Films shot in Bhutan
Films set in Bhutan
Dzongkha-language films
2010s Australian films